The 2023 World Junior Ice Hockey Championship Division I were international ice hockey tournaments organized by the International Ice Hockey Federation. It consisted of two tiered groups of six teams each: the second-tier Division I A and the third-tier Division I B. For each tier's tournament, the team which placed first was promoted to the next higher division, while the team which placed last was relegated to a lower division.

To be eligible as a junior player in these tournaments, a player couldn't be born earlier than 2003.

Division I A

The Division I A tournament was played in Asker, Norway, from 11 to 17 December 2022.

Participants

Match officials
Seven referees and linesmen were selected for the tournament.

Referees
 Pierre Dehaen
 Niclas Lundsgaard
 Mark Pearce
 Christian Persson
 Gregor Rezek
 Daniel Soós
 Jack Young

Linesmen
 Renārs Davidonis
 Christopher Dehn
 Tim Heffner
 Herman Johansen
 Davids Rozitis
 Christopher Williams
 Vincent Zede

Final standings

Results
All times are local (UTC+1).

Statistics

Top 10 scorers

GP = Games played; G = Goals; A = Assists; Pts = Points; +/− = Plus-minus; PIM = Penalties In Minutes
Source: IIHF

Goaltending leaders
(minimum 40% team's total ice time)

TOI = Time on ice (minutes:seconds); GA = Goals against; GAA = Goals against average; Sv% = Save percentage; SO = Shutouts
Source: IIHF

Best Players Selected by the Directorate
 Goaltender:  Markus Røhnebæk Stensrud
 Defenceman:  Zétény Hadobás
 Forward:  Matias Bachelet

Source: IIHF

Division I B

The Division I B tournament was played in Bytom, Poland, from 11 to 17 December 2022.

Participants

Match officials
Seven referees and linesmen were selected for the tournament.

Referees
 Andreas Huber
 Juraj Konč
 Paweł Kosidło
 Troy Murray
 Jiří Ondráček
 Omar Piniè
 Vladimir Yefremov

Linesmen
 Sebastian Bedynek
 Timur Iskakov
 Peter Jedlička
 Barna Kis-Király
 Mateusz Kucharewicz
 Andrzej Nenko
 Quentin Ugolini

Final standings

Results
All times are local (UTC+1).

Statistics

Top 10 scorers

GP = Games played; G = Goals; A = Assists; Pts = Points; +/− = Plus-minus; PIM = Penalties In Minutes
Source: IIHF

Goaltending leaders
(minimum 40% team's total ice time)

TOI = Time on ice (minutes:seconds); GA = Goals against; GAA = Goals against average; Sv% = Save percentage; SO = Shutouts
Source: IIHF

Best Players Selected by the Directorate
 Goaltender:  Damian Clara
 Defenceman:  Junya Owa
 Forward:  Danylo Korzhyletsky

Source: IIHF

References

External links
Division I A
Division I B

I
World Junior Ice Hockey Championships – Division I
World Junior Ice Hockey Championships
World Junior Ice Hockey Championships
World Junior Ice Hockey Championships